Cesenatico Lighthouse is an active lighthouse located on the south-west of the entrance to the channel-harbour of Cesenatico, Emilia-Romagna on the Adriatic Sea.

Description
The lighthouse is completely automated and operated by the Marina Militare with the identification code number 4028 E.F.

See also
 List of lighthouses in Italy
 Cesenatico

References

External links

 Servizio Fari Marina Militare

Lighthouses in Italy